Movie Juice is an Australian film review television series which screened between 2014 and 2018. The first two seasons screened on Network Ten at 2.30pm on Saturdays with repeats on its digital channels Eleven and One. It was revived by the Nine Network for a third season on 25 October 2017 at 11.30pm on Wednesdays with repeats on 9Go!.

Presenters
Jessica Tovey
Scott Tweedie
Alicia Marone
Carissa Walford

References

External links
 IMDb

Australian non-fiction television series
Network 10 original programming
Nine Network original programming
Film criticism television series
2014 Australian television series debuts
2015 Australian television series endings
2017 Australian television series debuts
English-language television shows
Cinema of Australia